The Tenor (formerly Metropolis, Toronto Life Square and 10 Dundas East) is a retail, office and entertainment complex development on the north-east corner of the intersection of Yonge Street and Dundas Street in Toronto, Ontario, Canada. The project was delayed several times, and sits on a large parcel of prime land in the city's downtown core, on the north side of Yonge–Dundas Square. The complex was owned and developed by PenEquity Management Corp., but is now owned by 10 Dundas St. Ltd.

History

Before 1998, the site was occupied by several buildings including the O'Keefe's Brewery (formerly Victoria Brewery) and a two-storey structure at the corner. From 1949 to 1974 it was home to the Brown Derby tavern and in the 1980s as a Mr. Submarine location. Many views of that intersection, and the local area as it looked in 1986, can be seen in the movie Short Circuit starring Ally Sheedy. All the buildings were demolished in the 1980s and 1990s.

The project was approved in 1998 with the opening planned for 2000. The land was expropriated by the City of Toronto immediately afterwards, and while construction boarding soon went up, the project suffered shutdowns and major delays.

While under construction it was known as Metropolis (as late as 2007), but when it opened, the complex was renamed "Toronto Life Square" after the local magazine. After the building was placed in court-ordered receivership in 2009, St. Joseph Communications, the owner of Toronto Life magazine, initiated a court action to have the magazine's name removed from the complex. The building was renamed "10 Dundas East" in September 2009. Entertainment Properties Trust, a Kansas City-based real estate investment trust that had provided construction financing for the project in 2005, acquired the complex in March 2010.

Architecture
The project was built in an L-configuration around a number of existing buildings, including a parking garage belonging to the adjacent Ryerson University (now Toronto Metropolitan University). In exchange for the air rights to build over its land, Ryerson gained use of the movie theatres as classrooms during daytime hours.

The exterior facing Dundas Square is primarily covered with giant video screens and static billboard advertisements of various sizes. The Yonge Street facade is made up of curtainwall store fronts with a glass and steel canopy overhanging the sidewalk. Toronto Star architecture critic Christopher Hume wrote a lengthy piece in the newspaper entitled "We don't deserve this ", which decried the building as a "nasty dark grey bunker". Daily Hive alluded the facade to Blade Runner 2049 per local artist Lucan Coutts.

Retail

10 Dundas Square East is anchored by a Cineplex Cinemas 23-screen movie theatre, Dollarama, an Adidas Sport Store, The Beer Store, the tourist attraction Little Canada, and restaurants including Jack Astor's and Milestones.

See also
Shopping mall
Entertainment Centrum

References

http://www.theglobeandmail.com/news/national/toronto/toronto-life-square-in-receivership/article1222909/

External links

Cinemas and movie theatres in Toronto
Commercial buildings completed in 2007
PATH (Toronto)
Power centers (retail)
Shopping malls in Toronto
2007 establishments in Ontario